Lalaloopsy is an animated children's television series based on the Lalaloopsy dolls from MGA Entertainment. It was produced by MGA and MoonScoop Entertainment. The series first aired on March 29, 2013.

The series' voice production was made and recorded in Calgary, AB, Canada, by Chinook Animation. After the first few episodes were aired on Nickelodeon, it was moved to the Nick Jr. Channel. The show's last episode aired on September 14, 2015. In December 2015, Viacom filed a lawsuit against MGA, stating that the toy company did not provide proper financing for the advertisement and production of the series. In September 2016, a judge awarded Viacom damages of over $14.9 million relating to the show. Less than a month later, the show was pulled from the lineup, with all traces of the show also being removed from Nick Jr.'s website.

Plot
Lalaloopsy focuses on Lalaloopsy Land. Lalaloopsy Land is inhabited by colorful rag dolls, who came to life the moment their last stitch was sewn. Each episode focuses on one or two groups of them facing a problem of their own and either solving it on their own or with incidental or previously planned help from the other group of dolls seen in the episode.

Episodes

Characters
Bea Spells-A-Lot (voiced by Hayley Stone)
Crumbs Sugar Cookie (voiced by Calista Schmidt)
Dot Starlight (voiced by Marissa Tawiah)
Jewel Sparkles (voiced by Selia Sangra)
Mittens Fluff ‘N’ Stuff (voiced by Paige Stone)
Pillow Featherbed (voiced by Zoe Marlett)
Peanut Big Top (voiced by Malia Ashley Kerr)
Rosy Bumps ‘N’ Bruises (voiced by Emma Duke)
Spot Splatter Splash (voiced by Tate McRae)

Supporting
Ace Fender Bender (voiced by Griffin Kingston)
Berry Jars ‘N’ Jam (voiced by Anna Quick)
Blanket Featherbed (voiced by Jordan Anderson)
Blossom Flowerpot (voiced by Cascadas Lucia Fuller)
Bundles Snuggle Stuff (voiced by Taylor Walters)
Candle Slice O’ Cake
Charlotte Charades (N/A)
Cherry Crisp Crust
Dyna Might (voiced by Jessica Hilbrecht)
Ember Flicker Flame (voiced by Jessica Young)
Forest Evergreen (voiced by Keaton Whitbread)
Haley Galaxy (voiced by Greer Hunt)
Holly Sleighbells (voiced by Tate McRae)
Little Bah Peep (voiced by Greer Hunt)
Mango Tiki Wiki (voiced by Jaida Shaleena Lewis)
Mari Golden Petals (voiced by Bella Orman)
Marina Anchors (voiced by Greer Hunt)
Misty Mysterious (voiced by Sara Matsubara)
Patch Treasurechest (voiced by Andrew Hilbrecht)
Peggy Seven Seas (voiced by Joanna Burchacki)
Pepper Pots ‘N’ Pans (voiced by Aurora Hunt)
Peppy Pom Poms (voiced by Sofia Tchernetsky)
Pickles B.L.T. (voiced by Jessica Hilbrecht)
Pix E. Flutters (voiced by Cascadas Lucia Fuller)
Prairie Dusty Trails (voiced by Bella Orman)
Scraps Stitched ‘N’ Sewn (voiced by Brittany Thurlow)
Scribbles Splash
Sir Battlescarred (voiced by Carson Pound)
Specs Reads-a-Lot
Sprinkle Spice Cookie
Squirt Lil Top
Squiggles N Shapes
Star Magic Spells
Sunny Side Up (voiced by Jessica Young)
Suzette La Sweet (voiced by Jessica Hilbrecht)
Tippy Tumblelina (voiced by Sophie Brown)
Trace E. Doodles
Trinket Sparkles
Winter Snowflake (voiced by Olivia Duke)

Broadcast
In Canada, the series premiered on May 4, 2013 on Treehouse TV, and later moved to Family Jr. until August 28, 2016.
In USA, the series premiered on March 29, 2013 and aired until October 2, 2016 on Nickelodeon and Nick Jr. In Southeast Asia, the series premiered on June 3, 2013 on Disney Junior channel.

Spin-off 
In 2017, Netflix released a follow-up Lalaloopsy animated series titled We're Lalaloopsy. The spinoff had a different art style from the previous series. However it included some of the show's characters.

Lawsuit 
In December 2015, Nickelodeon/Viacom filed a lawsuit against MGA Entertainment regarding the series. Viacom alleged that MGA didn't deliver the sufficient funds in financing for the series. In September 2016, a judge awarded Viacom damages of over $14.9 million relating to the show.

References

External links

 
 
 

2010s American animated television series
2013 American television series debuts
2015 American television series endings
American children's animated adventure television series
American children's animated fantasy television series
American flash animated television series
American preschool education television series
Animated preschool education television series
2010s preschool education television series
English-language television shows
Nick Jr. original programming
Treehouse TV original programming